Continuing Ed SD 50 is a public high school in Sandspit, British Columbia part of School District 50 Haida Gwaii/Queen Charlotte.

High schools in British Columbia
Educational institutions in Canada with year of establishment missing